This is a list of Danish television related events from 1991.

Events
16 March - Anders Frandsen is selected to represent Denmark at the 1991 Eurovision Song Contest with his song "Lige der hvor hjertet slår". He is selected to be the twenty-fourth Danish Eurovision entry during Dansk Melodi Grand Prix held at the Musikhuset in Aarhus.

Debuts

Television shows

Births

Deaths

See also
1991 in Denmark